The 36th Pennsylvania House of Representatives District is located in southwestern Pennsylvania and has been represented since 2021 by Jessica Benham.

District profile
The 36th Pennsylvania House of Representatives District is located in Allegheny County and includes the following areas:

 Brentwood
 Mount Oliver
 Pittsburgh (part)
 Ward 16 
 Ward 17 (part)
Division 04 
Division 05 
Division 06 
Division 07 
Division 08
 Ward 18 (part)
Division 01
 Ward 19 (part)
Division 11
Division 12 
Division 14 
Division 15 
Division 16 
Division 17 
Division 18 
Division 19 
Division 20 
Division 21 
Division 22 
Division 23 
Division 24 
Division 25 
Division 26 
Division 27 
Division 29
Division 30 
Division 31 
Division 32 
Division 33 
Division 34
Division 35 
Division 36 
Division 37 
Division 38
 Ward 29
 Ward 32

Representatives

Recent election results

References

External links
District map from the United States Census Bureau
Pennsylvania House Legislative District Maps from the Pennsylvania Redistricting Commission.  
Population Data for District 36 from the Pennsylvania Redistricting Commission.

Government of Allegheny County, Pennsylvania
36